
San Antonio Lake is a lake in the Beni Department, Bolivia. At an elevation of 205 m, its surface area is 26 km².

Lakes of Beni Department